Bill Westwater was an early twentieth-century Scottish-Canadian association football wing forward who played in Scotland, Canada and the United States.

In 1922, Westwater moved to Canada, spending one season with the Toronto All Scots before moving to Montreal Carsteel. In 1924, he played in the American Soccer League with New Bedford Whalers, and the following season with Boston Wonder Workers. After several seasons abroad he returned to play with former team Montreal Carsteel in 1926 and later with Montreal CNR in the National Soccer League.

External links

References

1987 deaths
Footballers from Edinburgh
American Soccer League (1921–1933) players
Boston Soccer Club players
Montreal Carsteel players
New Bedford Whalers players
Scottish footballers
Scottish expatriate footballers
Year of birth missing
Association football forwards
Scottish expatriate sportspeople in the United States
Expatriate soccer players in the United States
Scottish expatriate sportspeople in Canada
Expatriate soccer players in Canada
Canadian National Soccer League players